The President of the Senate of Colombia is the leader of the Senate and the Congress of the Republic of Colombia. The Presidency of Congress is assumed by the person elected as President of the Senate of Colombia by members of the Senate in an election held every year on July 20. The President of the Senate serves a term of one year without a chance for reelection in which they also assumes the presidency of Congress. The current President of Congress is Roy Barreras since July 20, 2022.

Functions

The President of Congress presides over general debates and also delegates duties to other members of Congress of the same political party. Aside from duties relating to heading Congress and the majority political party or coalition, the president also performs administrative and procedural functions, and remains the Representative of the congressional representation.

Among the president's other functions are leading the Administrative Directorate of Congress with the assistance of two Vice Presidents of Congress, a Secretary General and other staff to organize the internal functioning of the senate.

References

External links

 Congress of Colombia
 Senate of Colombia
 Law 5, 1992

Congress of Colombia